{{DISPLAYTITLE:C8H18N4O2}}
The molecular formula C8H18N4O2 (molar mass: 202.25 g/mol) may refer to:

 L-Arginine ethyl ester
 Asymmetric dimethylarginine (ADMA)

Molecular formulas